Mamadou Samassa (born 16 February 1990) is a professional footballer who plays as a goalkeeper and is now a free agent. 

Born in France, he represented the country at under-18, under-19, and under-20 levels, but represented Mali at full international level.

Club career

Guingamp
Samassa was the starting goalkeeper on Guingamp's under-18 team that won the 2008–09 edition of the Championnat National 18 ans.

On 23 September 2008, he signed his first professional contract agreeing to a four-year deal until 2013. For the 2010–11 season, he was installed as the club's starting goalkeeper for its campaign in the Championnat National, and stayed with the club during their rise from the third to the first division, remaining first choice keeper throughout. He shares the same name with his older cousin who plays as a striker.

Troyes
Samassa signed for French Ligue 2 club Troyes on a three-year deal. He made a total of 95 appearance for the club.

Sivasspor
On 15 June 2019, he signed a two-year contract with Turkish Süper Lig side Sivasspor.

Levadiakos
Samassa joined Super League Greece 2 side Levadiakos in September 2021.

Sri Pahang
Samassa completed a move to Malaysia Super League club Sri Pahang in January 2022. He was then released by the club at the end of the season after making 21 league and 5 league cup appearances.

International career
Samassa played his first match for the Mali national team on 13 October 2012, in a game against Botswana.

Career statistics

Club

Honours
Guingamp
 Coupe de France: 2013–14

Mali
Africa Cup of Nations bronze: 2013

See also
 Sub-Saharan African community of Paris

References

External links
 
 
 
 

Living people
1990 births
French sportspeople of Malian descent
Malian footballers
French footballers
Association football goalkeepers
France youth international footballers
Mali international footballers
2013 Africa Cup of Nations players
Ligue 1 players
Ligue 2 players
En Avant Guingamp players
ES Troyes AC players
Sivasspor footballers
Levadiakos F.C. players
Sri Pahang FC players
Malian expatriate footballers
French expatriate footballers
Malian expatriate sportspeople in Turkey
French expatriate sportspeople in Turkey
Expatriate footballers in Turkey
Malian expatriate sportspeople in Greece
French expatriate sportspeople in Greece
Expatriate footballers in Greece
French expatriate sportspeople in Malaysia
Expatriate footballers in Malaysia
Sportspeople from Montreuil, Seine-Saint-Denis
Footballers from Seine-Saint-Denis